Western Center was a state-run mental hospital and reform school in Pennsylvania. 

Western Center may also refer to:
Western Center Riograndense, a Mesoregions of the state of Rio Grande do Sul in Brazil.
Western Center for Archaeology & Paleontology, a museum located near Diamond Valley Lake in Hemet, California.
Western Center for Journalism, a conservative advocacy group in California.